Several football club (association football) prefer to utilise players who are born in or descended from a specific ethnic background.

Europe

Spain
Athletic Bilbao - The club will only field Basque players but will and have employed non-Basque coaching staff. The clubs cantera approach has produced players such as World Cup winners Bixente Lizarazu (France, 1998), Fernando Llorente and  Javi Martínez (Spain, 2010).
UE Olot - The club will only field players from the Catalan Countries.

Turkey
Altınordu F.K. - The club has never signed any non-Turkish players in order promote their youth talent from their own academy. Some of the players that came from this club were currently played in the top Europe league such as Çağlar Söyüncü of Leicester City, Cengiz Ünder of Marseille, and Burak İnce of Arminia Bielefeld.

Hungary
Paksi FC : The club use only Hungarian players. https://hu.wikipedia.org/wiki/Paksi FC

North America

Mexico

 C.D. Guadalajara - The club will only field Mexican players. The club's academy has produced players such as Mexican internationals Carlos Vela and Javier Hernández.

South America

Ecuador

 Club Deportivo El Nacional - The club has maintained a tradition of only playing Ecuadorian footballers,  which has given them the nickname of Puros Criollos ("Pure Natives"). They are administered by the Military of Ecuador.

Asia

Malaysia
 Petaling Jaya City - Starting from 2021, the club will only field Malaysian players. Currently, they are playing in Malaysia Super League.

Singapore
 Young Lions - Under the direct control of Football Association of Singapore, most of the players are part of the Singapore national under-23 football team.

See also 
 Athletic Bilbao signing policy

References 

Lists of association football clubs